Blepephaeus puae is a species of beetle in the family Cerambycidae. It was described by Lin in 2011. It is known from China.

References

Blepephaeus
Beetles described in 2011